Queen's University Belfast Rugby Football Club is the rugby union team of  Queen's University Belfast, currently playing in Division 2A of the All-Ireland League. 
Founded in 1869, it is the most successful and oldest continuous rugby union club in Northern Ireland. They originally played as Queen's College, Belfast and have won the Ulster Senior Cup a record 23 times.

In 1993 when the AIB League was expanded to four divisions with forty six senior clubs, five university clubs, including Queen's, joined the league. Queen's entered Division Four. Since then they played regularly in Division Three and  Division Four.

In 2000 they were relegated to the Ulster Senior League but returned to the AIB League two years later.

Their senior team will play the 2018–19 season in Division 2A of the AIL and Division 1 of the SONI Ulster Rugby Premiership.

Notable players
See also

Ireland
The following Queen's players have represented Ireland at full international level.

 James Allison
 Tommy Bowe
 Nigel Carr
 George Cromey
 Alexander Foster
 Noel Henderson
 David Hewitt
 Kenny Hooks
 David Humphreys
 David Irwin
 Jack Kyle
 Gary Longwell
 Bill McKay
 Rob Saunders
 Harry McKibbon
 Iain Henderson
 Paddy Mayne
 Henry O'Neill
 Cecil Pedlow
 Philip Rainey
 Harry Steele
 Robin Thompson
 William Tyrrell
 Roger Young

British & Irish Lions
The following Queen's players have also represented the British & Irish Lions.

 Alexander Foster: 1910
 William Tyrrell: 1910
 Henry O'Neill: 1930
 George Cromey: 1938
 Harry McKibbon: 1938
 Paddy Mayne: 1938
 Noel Henderson: 1950
 Jack Kyle: 1950
 Bill McKay: 1950
 Cecil Pedlow:  1955
 Robin Thompson:  1955
 David Hewitt: 1959, 1962
 Roger Young: 1966, 1968
 Richard Milliken: 1974
 David Irwin: 1983
 Trevor Ringland: 1983, 1986
 Nigel Carr: 1986
 Phillip Matthews: 1989
 Tommy Bowe: 2009, 2013

Honours
All-Ireland League
1923-24, 1931–32, 1936–37
Ulster Senior Cup: 24
 1885-86, 1886–87, 1889–90, 1890–91, 1891–92, 1899–1900, 1902–03, 1908–09, 1911–12, 1920–21, 1923–24, 1924–25, 1931–32, 1932–33, 1935–36, 1936–37, 1946–47, 1950–51, 1958–59, 1959–60, 1980–81, 2009–10, 2013-14, 2021-22
Ulster Senior League: 17 (3 shared)
 1890-91, 1899–1900, 1911–12, 1919–20, 1921–22, 1922–23, 1923–24, 1946–47, 1947–48, 1948–49, 1949–50, 1952–53 (shared), 1953–54 (shared), 1956–57 (shared), 1963–64, 1966–67, 1979–80
Ulster Junior Cup: 15
 †1888-89, †1889-90, †1920-21, †1932-33, †1933-34, †1937-38, †1946-47, †1947-48, †1948-49, †1950-51, †1951-52, †1958-59, †1963-64, †1968-69, †1969–70
Irish Universities Dudley Cup
Winners: 2013, 2015
 SONI Ulster Rugby Premiership Division 2
2017–18
† Won by 2nd XV
† Won by Freshers

Teams
 1st XV
 2nd XV
 3rd XV (Pirates)
 4th XV (Raiders)
 Ladies 1st XV

References

Rugby
RFC
Rugby clubs established in 1869
Rugby union clubs in Northern Ireland
University and college rugby union clubs in Ireland
Senior Irish rugby clubs (Ulster)
1869 establishments in Ireland
Rugby union clubs in County Antrim